The 2022 FC Edmonton season was the eleventh and final season in the history of FC Edmonton. In addition to the Canadian Premier League, the club competed in the Canadian Championship. The club was run directly by the CPL as the league searched for a new owner.

Squad 
As of July 11, 2022

Transfers

In

Loans in

Draft picks 
FC Edmonton will make the following selections in the 2022 CPL–U Sports Draft. Draft picks are not automatically signed to the team roster. Only those who are signed to a contract will be listed as transfers in.

Out

Pre-season and friendlies

Competitions
Matches are listed in Edmonton local time: Mountain Daylight Time (UTC−6) until November 5, and Mountain Standard Time (UTC−7) otherwise.

Overview

Canadian Premier League

Table

Results by match

Matches

Canadian Championship

Statistics

Squad and statistics 

|-

|}

Top scorers

Disciplinary record

References

2022
2022 Canadian Premier League
Canadian soccer clubs 2022 season
FC Ed